Bani Lavan (also Romanized as Bānī Lavān; also known as Bānī Lavān-e Tāyjūz and Bānī Lavān Tājez) is a village in Kalashi Rural District, Kalashi District, Javanrud County, Kermanshah Province, Iran. At the 2006 census, its population was 671, in 128 families.

References 

Populated places in Javanrud County